Andrew Staples (born 19 August 1979) is an English operatic tenor.

Education and training
Staples started as a chorister at St Paul's Cathedral and was accepted at Eton College under a musical scholarship.

Career
With The Royal Opera, Staples has sung Tamino in Die Zauberflöte, Narraboth in Salome, and Artabenes in Arne's Artaxerxes. He has also sung at opera houses in Salzburg, Hamburg, Brussels, and Prague.

Repertoire
 Die Zauberflöte, Tamino
 Salome, Narraboth 
 Artaxerxes, Artabenes

References

1979 births
21st-century British male opera singers
English operatic tenors
Living people
People educated at Eton College
People educated at St. Paul's Cathedral School